The City Hall Annex was a  high-rise in Jacksonville, Florida, located in the Northbank area of downtown.

History
Completed in 1960 as City Hall, the building's design was symbolic of the city's accession to modernity. It was designed by the architecture firm Reynolds, Smith & Hills. Until its implosion in 2019, the building served as a prime example of Mid-century modern architecture. 
The building served as Jacksonville's city hall from its opening until the late 1990s, when the city renovated the St. James Building to become its new city hall.
Following the relocation of city hall, the building became an annex for other city departments. The building closed permanently in 2017, with the city planning to demolish it to make room for a new convention center project that was later scrapped.
The building was demolished in early 2019, along with the adjacent former county courthouse building. The property it sat on is currently being marketed for development.

Gallery

See also
 Architecture of Jacksonville
 Downtown Jacksonville

References

Skyscraper office buildings in Jacksonville, Florida
Jacksonville Modern architecture
Former seats of local government
Downtown Jacksonville
Northbank, Jacksonville
Architecture in Jacksonville, Florida
Government buildings completed in 1960
Buildings and structures demolished in 2019
Demolished buildings and structures in Florida
Buildings and structures demolished by controlled implosion
1960 establishments in Florida
2019 disestablishments in Florida
Former skyscrapers